Acantharctia flavicosta is a moth of the family Erebidae. It was described by George Hampson in 1900. It is found in Uganda and Zimbabwe.

References 

Moths described in 1900
Spilosomina
Lepidoptera of Uganda
Lepidoptera of Malawi
Lepidoptera of Tanzania
Insects of Zimbabwe
Moths of Africa